Lux Aeterna may refer to:
 Lux Aeterna (Communion), the Communion antiphon for the Roman Catholic Requiem Mass

As such, it has often been set to music. The following works are settings of it, or have been inspired by it:
 Lux Aeterna (Dave Fitzgerald album) (1997)
 Lux Aeterna (Terje Rypdal album) (2002)
 Lux Aeterna (Ligeti), a 1966 choral work by György Ligeti used in the film 2001: A Space Odyssey
 "Lux Aeterna" (Mansell), the theme song to Requiem for a Dream, written by Clint Mansell and performed by the Kronos Quartet
 "Lux Aeterna", a section of the liturgy from Requiem (Verdi) by Giuseppe Verdi
 Lux Aeterna, a 1972 album by William Sheller
 Lux aeterna, a 2011 work for mixed SATB choir by Robert Paterson (composer)
 Lux Aeterna, a 1997 five-movement quasi-Requiem by Morten Lauridsen
 "Lux Aeterna", a 2009 track by Christopher Tin from Calling All Dawns
 "Lux Aeterna", a 2014 song by Two Steps from Hell from the Miracles (Two Steps from Hell album)
 "Lux Æterna" (Metallica song), 2022 single by Metallica from their 2023 album 72 Seasons
 Lux Aeterna for 5 masked musicians, a 1971 avant-garde piece by George Crumb
 Symphony N 5 Lux Aeterna, a 2006 avant-garde piece by Vassil Kazandjiev
 Lux Aeterna for organ, a 1974 work by Joonas Kokkonen
 Lux aeterna, a 1926 symphonic poem for orchestra with viola obligato by Howard Hanson

See also
 Lux Æterna (film), a 2019 film directed by Gaspar Noé
 Luxturna, trade name for voretigene neparvovec, a gene therapy for the treatment of Leber's congenital amaurosis
 Sanctuary lamp or eternal light
 Lux perpetua (disambiguation), synonymous term